Lord Carter may refer to

 Denis Carter, Baron Carter of Devizes (1932–2006), British agriculturalist and politician
 Patrick Carter, Baron Carter of Coles (born 1946), British review panel chairman
 Stephen Carter, Baron Carter of Barnes (born 1964), Scottish businessman and politician
 Harold Carter, Baron Carter of Haslemere, British lawyer

See also
 Mark Bonham Carter, Baron Bonham-Carter (1922–1994), English publisher and politician